Sessão da Tarde (English: Afternoon Session) is a Brazilian television program on TV Globo that shows movies on Monday through Friday afternoons. Launching on 5 March 1974, it is one of the most enduring movie screenings.

Opening theme
 5 March 1974 – 1989: The first vignette has many pictures, and at the end the letters fly off the screen, setting up the logo. This was followed by an instrumental before the next vignette. During the 1989–1990 Christmas season, the block was temporarily replaced by Festival de Férias (Holiday Festival).
 1990–1999: In this opening a rainbow in the sky appears under the names that make up the logo (gold color) and at the end, the rainbow and the sky are transferred to a dark background and form the logo.
 1999–2004: The opening was updated: The rainbow was replaced by translucent colors. The clouds and the animation of the logo were redone. The first version aired from 1999 to 2000, the second version came up in 2004, with the logo looking like the Globo glass.
 2004–4 October 2013: The source became a translucent blue, while the logo's letters revolved around a rainbow in the sky. By forming the logo, the rainbow is combined with the first word.
 7 October 2013–Present: The opening changed identity and arrangement. The lines of varying sizes are scattered and change the color of the background and at the end the bands form the new logo.

Movies

In general, the films presented are comedy, adventure and action. At one point the show presented a variety of movies, but with the emergence of the ClassInd system, much of its heritage disappeared, as it can only show L- or 10-rated films. The classic movies of Sessão da Tarde are various, such as The Blue Lagoon, Home Alone, La misma luna, Matilda, Edward Scissorhands, Police Academy, Barbie as Rapunzel, Dirty Dancing and Ghost, among many others.

On 28 November 2017, Sessão da Tarde aired its first 12-rated film, Addams Family Values, but only on certain affiliates.

On 20 September 2018, Globo affiliate RBS TV in Rio Grande do Sul aired the 14-rated film O Tempo e o Vento in Sessão da Tardes time slot; the rest of the country saw the 10-rated Playing House.

Ratings
Currently, across Brazil the movie session averages 15 points and 47% interest, and is the leader in its exhibition schedule. The audience demographic is mostly people between 25 and 49 years (37%), class C (53%) versus 24% of class A and B, and 23% of classes D and E. Most are women over 18, who make up 49% of the audience.

References

1974 Brazilian television series debuts
Rede Globo original programming
Motion picture television series
1970s Brazilian television series
1980s Brazilian television series
1990s Brazilian television series
2000s Brazilian television series
2010s Brazilian television series
2020s Brazilian television series
Portuguese-language television shows